Persiaran KLCC MRT station (Working name: KLCC East) is a mass rapid transit (MRT) station in the KLCC subdistrict in Kuala Lumpur, Malaysia. It is one of the stations under the MRT Putrajaya Line.

Station details

Location 
The station is located on Persiaran KLCC on the site of a former multi-storey car park. It is near the As Syakirin Mosque, and is within walking distance to KLCC Park.

Exits and entrances 
There will be a total of 3 entrances in the future. As of today, Entrance B is the only entry to the MRT station due to the new KLCC development nearby it.

Connection with Kelana Jaya Line
Despite its name, the MRT station is about 700 metres walking distance from Suria KLCC mall and the Petronas Towers, which are directly served by the  KLCC LRT station on the  Kelana Jaya Line, which is also underground. 

According to reports, a bridge or a pedestrian walkway was planned, thus allowing pedestrian access between the MRT station and the LRT station, through the Suria KLCC mall.

References

External links
 KLCC East MRT Station | mrt.com.my
 Klang Valley Mass Rapid Transit
 MRT Hawk-Eye View

Rapid transit stations in Kuala Lumpur
Sungai Buloh-Serdang-Putrajaya Line